The Australian national cricket team toured India in the winter of 1959-60. The two teams played five Tests, with Australia winning two, India winning one, and two others being drawn. The Australians also played several matches against domestic Indian squads.

At the time of its arrival in India, the Australian cricket team was acclaimed as the strongest side in the world, having won 11 of its last 16 Tests and lost none. In the years just prior, they had not only defeated India, but also South Africa, England, and Pakistan as well. The confident Aussies, led by captain Richie Benaud, featured such names as Neil Harvey, Norm O'Neill, Ray Lindwall, and Ian Meckiff among others. Meanwhile, India had dropped 11 of its last 13 Tests, including humbling defeats at the hands of Australia, the West Indies, and England, and had not won a single one. The Indians seemed to be struggling with every aspect of the game – batting, bowling, and fielding – not to mention leadership and the maintenance of a "fighting spirit." Hence, this series between Benaud's Australians and Gulabrai Ramchand's Indian team had a true David vs. Goliath nature to it.

Touring party

Richie Benaud (captain)
Neil Harvey (vice captain)
Peter Burge
Alan Davidson
Ken Mackay
Barry Jarman
Colin McDonald
Ian Meckiff
Les Favell
Wally Grout
Lindsay Kline
Ray Lindwall
Norm O'Neill
Gordon Rorke
Gavin Stevens

Test matches

1st Test

2nd Test

The second Test at Kanpur was notable for being India's first-ever Test victory over the Australians. Indian off-spinner Jasu Patel distinguished himself, taking 14 wickets in the match (nine wickets in the first innings and five in the second). He would go on to take 19 wickets in the series.

3rd Test

4th Test

5th Test

Tour matches

Three-day: Indian Board President's XI v Australians

Three-day: Indian Universities v Australians

References

External links
 Tour home at ESPN Cricinfo

1959 in Australian cricket
1959 in Indian cricket
1960 in Australian cricket
1960 in Indian cricket
1959-60
Indian cricket seasons from 1945–46 to 1969–70
International cricket competitions from 1945–46 to 1960